The Egede II cabinet has governed Greenland since April 2022.

Ministers

References

See also 

 Politics of Greenland
 First Egede cabinet

Government of Greenland
Coalition governments
Politics of Greenland
Political organisations based in Greenland
Egede
Cabinets established in 2022
2022 in Greenland
Greenland politics-related lists
Current governments